Albrecht Fölsing (1940 in Bad Salzungen – 8 April 2018 in Hamburg) was a trained physicist turned into a scientific journalist. Having studied physics in Berlin, Philadelphia, and Hamburg, he worked as an academic research assistant for the German electron synchrotron named DESY. In the years 1973–2001, Fölsing was head of the Nature and Science Department of the North German Radio and Television. He has written several biographies of well-known physicists and studies of the "cheating factor" in science. His most widely known book is perhaps Albert Einstein: A Biography, which also gathers many quotations by Einstein.

Bibliography

References

1940 births
2018 deaths
People from Bad Salzungen
20th-century German physicists
German male writers
University of Hamburg alumni